Arthur James May (1899–June 13, 1968) was an historian, a professor, and "an authority on the history of modern Europe."

May was born in Rockdale, Pennsylvania. He received a Bachelor's Degree from Wesleyan University and a Master's and Doctorate from the University of Pennsylvania. "He taught at the University of Pennsylvania and Brown University" before he came to the University of Rochester in 1925.

He was a prolific speaker, frequently lecturing in the United States and Europe on "historical and contemporary issues." He was the author of a number of works of history, particularly the history of Eastern Europe. His book The Hapsburg monarchy, 1867-1914 won The Herbert Baxter Adams Prize of the American Historical Association in 1952. He was named one of "three distinguished pioneer American scholars of Hapsburg history." His last book A History of the University of Rochester, 1850-1962 was published posthumously.

May was a member of the American Historical Association, the American Association of University Professors, and the International Committee for the Study of the Hapsburg Monarchy, and an honorary member of Phi Beta Kappa.

May retired from teaching in 1964 and became the University Historian at Rochester.

Publications

References

External links
 WorldCat author page for Arthur J. May

1968 deaths
University of Rochester faculty
People from Rochester, New York
Wesleyan University alumni
University of Pennsylvania alumni
Year of birth uncertain
Historians from New York (state)